Floyd Eddings (born December 15, 1958) is a former American football wide receiver. He played for the New York Giants from 1982 to 1983.

References

1958 births
Living people
American football wide receivers
California Golden Bears football players
New York Giants players